Grobnik is a village in the Istria County, Croatia. Administratively it belongs to the municipality of Pićan. Originally an Istro-Romanian village, the last speaker of the language in the village, Liberat Pahor, died in 1998.

Population

References

External links 
Official homepage of Pićan
Tourist homepage

Populated places in Istria County